The Albanian Institute for International Studies 
s a think tank based in Tirana, Albania. It is a non-governmental, non-profit research and policy think tank.

History and profile
AIIS was launched by Albanian academics and analysts in 1997 and registered in 2002. Its research and projects focuses on three main areas: European integration, democratization process, and Balkan developments. Tirana Times is the official media partner of AIIS. In addition, AIIS publishes several studies and organizes events in accordance with its study focus. Its analyses have been employed by Albanian policy-makers and international partners in the fields of security studies, democracy, Euro-Atlantic integration and regional cooperation.

AIIS is governed by a board of directors. The  AIIS chairman is [Albert Rakipi]  The staff of AIIS include Albanian and international scholars.

References

External links

1997 establishments in Albania
Political and economic think tanks based in Europe
Think tanks established in 1997
Think tanks based in Albania